Acoelorrhaphe is a genus of palms with single species Acoelorrhaphe wrightii, known as the Paurotis palm, Everglades palm or Madeira palm in English and cubas, tique, and papta in Spanish.

It is native to Central America, southeastern Mexico, the Caribbean, Colombia, the Bahamas, and extreme southern Florida where it grows in swamps and periodically flooded forests. The flowers are minute, inconspicuous and greenish, with 6 stamens. The trunk is covered with fibrous matting. The fruit is pea-sized, starting orange and turning to black at maturity.

The genus name is often cited as Acoelorraphe, a spelling error to be corrected under the provisions of the ICBN. The genus name is a combination of three Greek words meaning a- 'without',  'hollow', and  'needle', an allusion to the form of the fruit. The species is named after the American botanist Charles Wright.

Cultivation and uses

The Paurotis palm was formerly plentiful in the Florida Everglades, but many plants were taken for the nursery trade. The palm is now protected in the wild by Florida law and its numbers are increasing again. Trees propagated from seed or by sawing apart the base of a cluster are available in nurseries. It is hardy to central and southern Florida and is cultivated as a landscape palm.

Gallery

References

Livistoninae
Trees of the Caribbean
Trees of Central America
Trees of the Southeastern United States
Trees of the Bahamas
Trees of Southeastern Mexico
Trees of Veracruz
Trees of Colombia
Monotypic Arecaceae genera
Garden plants of North America